Eldin Huseinbegović (born 1 January 1978) is a Bosnian singer-songwriter. He has recorded songs with Dino Merlin and Hari Mata Hari.

Biography
Huseinbegović was born in Sarajevo. His first public performance was at the festival "Mali Šlager" (Little Chanson) in 1987 in Sarajevo. He graduated music school in 1992. From 1992 until 1996 he dedicated himself to the performance of spiritual music. In 1997 he was the winner of "Studentsko Ljeto" (Student's Summer) festival. 
In Maglaj 1998 Eldin won 2nd place jury prize for best music at the festival, "Tamo Gdje Ljubav Počinje" (Where Love Begins). In 1997 event held at Goražde, Eldin participated in B&H choice for Eurovision Song Contest. And in 1999 he participated again as the singer and songwriter. In 2000 he took part in the Festival of Popular Music "Bihać 2000". 

Since 2002 he has worked as a tenor at the Opera Narodnog Pozorišta (National Theatre Opera) in Sarajevo and participated in a large number of operas and concerts (La Traviata, Le nozze di Figaro, Nabuko, Hasanaginica, Ero S’Onog Svijeta, Requiem (Mozart), Requiem (Verdi), Tosca, Die Fledermaus, L'elisir d'amore, Zrinjski).

In 2007 and 2008 he took part in the "BiH Radijsko-Televizijski Festival" (B&H Radio-Television Festival) and both times won the prize for best interpretation.
In 2009 he was awarded "Isa-beg Ishaković" award for his contribution to the cultural and musical heritage of B&H.
In 2010 he was awarded "Etno-pop pjevač godine u BiH" (Ethno-pop singer in B&H). His album Kaldrma (2010) is an autobiographical work and was a gift to his wife, Emka.

Eldin is the owner of musical studio "Džaan" (1999). 
He is also a member of the "Balkanska Muzička Akademija" (Balkan Music Academy; 30 January 2010) composed of the best authors and producers from the Balkans. He has written over 100 songs.

As a songwriter he intensively cooperates with the biggest musical names in the region (Dino Merlin, Hari Mata Hari, Marija Šerifović, Elvira Rahić, Enes Begović, Osman Hadžić, Dženan Lončarević, Jelena Tomašević).

On 12 August 2019 (2nd day of Eid al-Adha 2019), Huseinbegović was Armin Muzaferija's guest on Zenica city-square concert entitled "Eid solemnity".

Discography
Studio albums
Kaldrma (Street, 2010)

Singles
Poslije tebe (After You, 2007)
Tako bih rado (I Wish So, 2008)
Strijela sudbine (Arrow of Destiny, 2009)

As featured artist
Da šutiš (To Be Quiet, 2008) with Dino Merlin
Tvoje je samo to što daš (Only What You Give Is Yours, 2009) with Hari Mata Hari

References

External links

Official Website

1978 births
Living people
Singers from Sarajevo
Bosniaks of Bosnia and Herzegovina
Bosnia and Herzegovina rock musicians
21st-century Bosnia and Herzegovina male singers
Bosnia and Herzegovina Muslims
Bosnia and Herzegovina songwriters
Bosnia and Herzegovina rock singers